The River Street Bridge over the Iowa River at Iowa Falls, Iowa is an open spandrel bridge built during 1922–1924.  It was built by the Weldon Brothers at cost of $16,900, including removal of the previous bridge on the site.  It is the fourth bridge constructed on the site, a "pivotal" location in Iowa Falls' development.  It has a long span, and is built with three side-by-side arched ribs supporting concrete pillars.

The bridge was modified in 1958 by widening of its deck and replacement of its guardrails. It was listed on the National Register of Historic Places in 1998.

References

Road bridges on the National Register of Historic Places in Iowa
Bridges completed in 1924
Bridges in Hardin County, Iowa
Iowa Falls, Iowa
National Register of Historic Places in Hardin County, Iowa
Arch bridges in Iowa
Open-spandrel deck arch bridges in the United States